Niekurza  is a village in the administrative district of Gmina Osiek, within Staszów County, Świętokrzyskie Voivodeship, in south-central Poland.

The village has a population of  238.

Demography 
According to the 2002 Poland census, there were 259 people residing in Niekurza village, of whom 49.4% were male and 50.6% were female. In the village, the population was spread out, with 27% under the age of 18, 32.1% from 18 to 44, 14.2% from 45 to 64, and 26.7% who were 65 years of age or older.
 Figure 1. Population pyramid of village in 2002 — by age group and sex

Former parts of village — physiographic objects 
In the years 1970 of last age, sorted and prepared out list part of names of localities for Niekurza, what you can see in table 3.

References

Niekurza